Prophecy I: The Fall of Trinadon is an action role-playing game created in 1989 by Activision.

Plot
The game takes place in the Gendorian empire, ruled by a tyrant named Krellane. The unnamed hero's father was part of a resistance movement called the "Jedists," but he ran afoul of Krellane's forces and was forced to flee into the forests, where he founded a hidden town called CrissCross. The hero was raised with martial and magical training, in hopes that he would one day fulfill a prophecy and destroy Krellane. Just as the game begins, Krellane's forces have found the village. The hero awakens to the shrieks of his fellow townsfolk being butchered in the night and soon discovers he is the last survivor.

Reception
In 1989, Dragon gave the game 3½ out of 5 stars. Computer Gaming World gave the game a glowing review, saying, "Prophecy can be played as an arcade game, allowing players to go around bashing monsters and collecting treasure to their heart's content, but its real magic is that the fiction is totally believable."

In 1992, Computer Gaming World retrospectively described it as "Another of the Nintendo-style, single-character CRPGs, with a plot heavily borrowed from Star Wars" but with "Fast-paced arcade fighting". They concluded it to be fun for "those who like their action hot and heavy" but not for "those who aren't into arcade-type" combat.

Reviews
ASM (Aktueller Software Markt) - May, 1989
ACE (Advanced Computer Entertainment) - Jul, 1989

References

External links

1989 video games
Action role-playing video games
Activision games
DOS games
DOS-only games
Video games developed in the United States